Brendan Howlin (born 9 May 1956) is an Irish Labour Party politician who has been a Teachta Dála (TD) for the Wexford constituency since 1987. He previously served as Leader of the Labour Party from 2016 to 2020, Minister for Public Expenditure and Reform from 2011 to 2016, Leas-Cheann Comhairle from 2007 to 2011, Deputy Leader of the Labour Party from 1997 to 2002, Minister for the Environment from 1994 to 1997 and Minister for Health from 1993 to 1994. He was a Senator from 1983 to 1987, after being nominated by the Taoiseach.

Early life
Born into a highly political family in Wexford, Howlin is the son of John and Molly Howlin (née Dunbar), and named after Brendan Corish, the local Labour TD and future leader of the Labour Party. Howlin's father was a trade union official who served as secretary of the Irish Transport and General Workers' Union, in Wexford, for 40 years. He also secured election as a Labour member of Wexford Corporation, where he served for eighteen years, and was also election agent to Brendan Corish. Howlin's mother was also strongly involved in local Labour politics. Howlin's brother Ted is a former member of Wexford County Council and Lord Mayor of Wexford.
 
Howlin grew up in Wexford town and was educated locally at Wexford CBS. He later attended St Patrick's College, Drumcondra, Dublin, and qualified as a primary school teacher. During his career as a teacher he was active in the Irish National Teachers' Organisation, before embarking on a career in full-time politics.

Political career

Early years (1982–1993)
Howlin contested his first general election at the November 1982 election. He ran as a Labour candidate in the Wexford constituency, but despite the existence of a large left-wing vote in the area, Howlin was not elected. In spite of this setback, a Fine Gael-Labour Party coalition government came to power and he was nominated by the Taoiseach Garret FitzGerald to serve in Seanad Éireann as a Senator. Howlin secured election to Wexford County Council in 1985 and served as Mayor of Wexford in 1986.

In 1987, the Labour Party withdrew from the coalition government and a general election was called. Howlin once again contested a seat in Wexford and was elected to Dáil Éireann. Labour were out of office as a Fianna Fáil government took office. In spite of his recent entry to the Dáil, Howlin was subsequently named Chief Whip of the Labour Party, a position he held until 1993.

Cabinet minister (1993–1997)
The 1992 general election resulted in a hung Dáil once again; however, the Labour Party enjoyed their best result to date at the time. After negotiations, a Fianna Fáil-Labour Party coalition government came to office. Howlin joined the cabinet of Taoiseach Albert Reynolds, as Minister for Health. During his tenure the development of a four-year health strategy, the identifying of HIV/AIDS prevention as a priority and the securing of a £35 million investment in childcare were advanced. Howlin, however, was also targeted by anti-abortion groups after introducing an act which would allow information regarding abortion.

In 1994, the Labour Party withdrew from government after a disagreement over the appointment of Attorney General Harry Whelehan as a Judge of the High Court and President of the High Court. However, no general election was called and, while it was hoped that the coalition could be revived under the new Fianna Fáil leader Bertie Ahern, the arithmetic of the Dáil now allowed the Labour Party to open discussions with other opposition parties. After negotiations a Rainbow Coalition came to power involving Fine Gael, Labour and Democratic Left. In John Bruton's cabinet, he became Minister for the Environment.

Leadership contender (1997)
Following the 1997 general election, a Fianna Fáil-Progressive Democrats coalition government came to power and the Labour Party returned to the opposition benches. In the announcement of the party's new front bench, Howlin retained responsibility for the Environment.

In late 1997, Dick Spring resigned as leader of the Labour Party and Howlin immediately threw his hat into the ring in the subsequent leadership election. In a choice between Howlin and Ruairi Quinn, the former gained some early support; however, the leadership eventually went to Quinn by a significant majority. As a show of unity Howlin was later named deputy leader of the party and retained his brief as Spokesperson for the Environment and Local Government.

Leadership contender (2002)
In 2002, following Quinn's resignation as party leader after Labour's relatively unsuccessful 2002 general election campaign, Howlin again stood for the party leadership. For the second time in five years Howlin was defeated for the leadership of the party, this time by Pat Rabbitte, who was formerly a leading figure in Democratic Left. Howlin was succeeded as deputy leader by Liz McManus.

While having been publicly supportive of Rabbitte's leadership, he was perceived as being the leader of the wing of the party which was sceptical of Rabbitte's policy with regard to future coalition with Fianna Fáil. Rabbitte explicitly ruled out any future coalition with Fianna Fáil, instead forming a formal alliance with Fine Gael in the run-up to the 2007 general election (the so-called Mullingar Accord).

Leas-Cheann Comhairle (2007–2011)
On 26 June 2007, Howlin was appointed the Leas-Cheann Comhairle (deputy chairperson) of Dáil Éireann.

Cabinet minister (2011–2016)

After the 2011 general election, Fine Gael and the Labour Party formed a government, Howlin was appointed to the new office of Minister for Public Expenditure and Reform. In May 2011, he said that over the next 20 years the number of people in Ireland over 65 is set to increase by almost half a million, a situation that could see the annual health budget soar – rising by €12.5 billion in the next decade alone. While reform was a major part of government attempts "to regain full sovereignty over economic policy", Howlin told a meeting of the Association of Chief Executives of State Agencies they would in any event face key "imperatives" in coming years. He said a new public spending review, on which he had briefed the cabinet in recent days, would not be a simple assessment of where to make cuts, but would also consider the way public sector services were delivered. Howlin reiterated the government's commitment not to cut public sector pay, "if the Croke Park Agreement works". "These are just some of the challenges that our society is facing in the coming decade – crisis or no crisis. In the good times, tackling them was going to be difficult. Today, in these difficult times, tackling them is going to be imperative." Howlin said Ireland was facing a profound and complex economic crisis "where we are fighting a battle on three fronts – mass unemployment, a major failure in banking, and a fiscal crisis".

Analysis of budgets
Budgets 2012 to 2016 - introduced in part by Brendan Howlin as Minister for Public Expenditure and supported by Labour - were described by the Economic and Social Research Institute (ESRI) as "regressive".

It found "Budget 2012 involved greater proportionate losses for those on low incomes: reductions of about 2 to 2½ per cent for those with the lowest incomes, as against losses of about ¾ of a per cent for those on the highest incomes".

By contrast, the ESRI found earlier budgets in 2008–2010 to be "strongly progressive" because before 2011 "Losses imposed by policy changes in tax and welfare have been greatest for those on the highest incomes, and smaller for those on low incomes".

However, it concluded "Budget 2014 had its greatest impact – a reduction of 2 per cent – on low income groups".
The ESRI described Budget 2015 as having a "pattern of losses in the bottom half of the income distribution, declining as income rises, and gains in the upper reaches", which "can clearly be described as regressive".

Labour Party leadership (2016–2020)
Howlin retained his seat in the Dáil following the 2016 general election, though only six of his Labour colleagues did likewise and the party returned to the opposition benches. Following the resignation of Joan Burton, Howlin contested the 2016 Labour Party leadership election unopposed and was elected Leader of the Labour Party on 20 May 2016.

Criticism of the Taoiseach for failing to invite Howlin to meet ambulance crews
In March 2018, Howlin criticised Taoiseach Leo Varadkar for failing to personally invite him to accompany Varadkar as he met ambulance crews in Howlin's constituency of Wexford. Varadkar replied that he had been far too busy dealing with the recent weather crisis and Brexit "to organise invitations to Deputies personally in order that they [Howlin] felt included". It was separately said of Howlin's complaint "It appears that the Taoiseach, the chief executive of the State, needs the imprimatur of local politicians when he enters their bailiwick, and needs to be accompanied and monitored by those same politicians while he is in their realm."

Leadership challenge
Alan Kelly challenged Howlin for the party leadership in 2018, stating that he had failed to 'turn the ship around'. Howlin stated that Kelly's comments were a disappointing and unnecessary distraction. Howlin also said that there was not a single parliamentary party member that supported the challenge and that Kelly had the backing of a minority of councillors. Howlin told The Irish Times that there was no formal proposition made to the Central Council (which would deal with any formal leadership challenge).

2020 general election
In September 2018, Howlin stated that winning 14 seats in the 33rd Dail was a realistic goal. During the campaign in 2020, Howlin stated that his wish to end the U.S.A's use of Shannon airport for military related activities. In the 2020 general election party first preference vote dropped to 4.4% of first preference votes and returned 6 seats - a record low. Howlin announced his intention to step down as leader on the 12 February 2020. He also said that the Labour Party should not formally enter government, a view that was backed by the parliamentary party. He also stated that he would not back any candidate in the following contest. On 15 February 2020, Howlin ruled himself out as a candidate for Ceann Comhairle of the 33rd Dail, with the polling day to elect his successor set for 3 April 2020.

After leadership (2020–present) 
In 2020, Howlin's legislation (Harassment, Harmful Communications and Related Offences Bill) was passed and signed into law by Michael D. Higgins. This bill made the distribution of intimate images or "revenge porn" a criminal offense, and made other forms of cyber-bullying and harassment punishable.

Personal life
Howlin is a single man. He has spoken publicly of receiving hate mail relating to his private life and questioning his sexual orientation. In an interview with The Star during the 2002 Labour Party leadership contest, in response to repeated speculation, he announced he was "not gay".

References

External links

Brendan Howlin's page on the Labour Party website

 

1956 births
Living people
Alumni of St Patrick's College, Dublin
Irish schoolteachers
Labour Party (Ireland) TDs
Leaders of the Labour Party (Ireland)
Local councillors in County Wexford
Mayors of places in the Republic of Ireland
Members of the 17th Seanad
Members of the 25th Dáil
Members of the 26th Dáil
Members of the 27th Dáil
Members of the 28th Dáil
Members of the 29th Dáil
Members of the 30th Dáil
Members of the 31st Dáil
Members of the 32nd Dáil
Members of the 33rd Dáil
Ministers for the Environment (Ireland)
Ministers for Health (Ireland)
Nominated members of Seanad Éireann
Labour Party (Ireland) senators
People from Wexford, County Wexford
Politicians from County Wexford
Ministers for Public Expenditure, National Development Plan Delivery and Reform